Verkhnyaya Shardenga is a rural locality (a selo) and the administrative center of Verkhneshardengskoye Rural Settlement, Velikoustyugsky District, Vologda Oblast, Russia. The population was 209 as of 2002.

Geography 
Verkhnyaya Shardenga is located 50 km south of Veliky Ustyug (the district's administrative centre) by road. Gorbachevo is the nearest rural locality.

References 

Rural localities in Velikoustyugsky District